Jick has been used as a nickname and a surname. Notable people with the name include:

Nickname
 Zack "Jick" Johnson of Kingdom of Loathing
 Tsuyoshi Ujiki (born 1957), Japanese entertainer, actor, musician, and singer

Surname
 Andy Jick (1952–2019), American public address announcer
 Hershel Jick, American medical researcher